National Lampoon's TV: The Movie is a 2006 American parody film that features several cast members from the Jackass franchise, including Steve-O, Preston Lacy, Jason "Wee Man" Acuña and Chris Pontius.   The film is a channel-surfing adventure through television programs and commercials.  It features parodies of many television shows, such as Fear Factor, Cops, MTV Cribs, The Six Million Dollar Man and Miami Vice. A series of over fifty sketches makes up the movie: cartoons, reality shows, fake movie trailers, fake TV show trailers, and computer animation.

Cast
 Steve-O as himself/Satan/Stingray/Steve-O Doll
 Preston Lacy as Big Fat Party Guy/XXXL/Before/Michael Moore/Preston Lacy Doll/Ogre/Mrs. Smith
 Jason "Wee Man" Acuña as My Little Buddy/Wee-Man Doll/Cricket/Mobutu
 Chris Pontius as Jesus
 Ehren McGhehey as Jimmy Gonzalas
 Manny Puig as Manny the Gator Guy
 Clifton Collins Jr. as Tijuana Cop #1/Minion/Miranda
 Jacob Vargas as Tijuana Cop #2/Announcer/Charlotte
 Dian Bachar as Gregg/Luigi/Cathy Ave/Joshua Benson/Other Fly/Stranger
 Lee Majors as Dr. Lakin/Announcer/Lieutenant/Six Million Year-Old Man/Cowboy
 Sam Maccarone as Chad/Kid/Dick Weston Fernandez/Jeffry Sutton/Dealer/T-Rex (as Sam Maccarone)
 Jason Mewes as Carrie
 Judd Nelson as Fear Factor Host/Judd
 Danny Trejo as Crow 
 Dimitry Elyashkevich as Ace Glover/Jackoff Smirnoff
 Tony Cox as Stubbs
 J.J. Darshaw as Gringo
 Ahmet Zappa as Army Host
 Pete Yorn as Bobby Peacock
 Ryan Simonetti as himself
 Dave Buckner as himself
 Elisa Donovan as Suzy Gottlieb
 Ian Somerhalder as Guy
 Eugenio Derbez as Derbez, Eugenio

Production
The film stars Lee Majors, Jason Mewes, Sam Maccarone, Steve-O, Chris Pontius, Preston Lacy, Judd Nelson, Jason Acuña, Dian Bachar and Jacob Vargas. It was written by Sam Maccarone, Preston Lacy and Cyrus Ahanchian. The film was shot in 35mm, HD and miniDV.

The MTV Cribs parody with Steve-O and director Sam Maccarone was shot at 5am by Maccarone, with just the two of them and no crew.

Reception
National Lampoon's TV: The Movie received overwhelmingly negative reviews.

References

External links

 

TV: The Movie
2006 direct-to-video films
2006 films
2006 comedy films
Jackass (TV series)
2000s English-language films